Argyrotaenia posticicnephaea is a species of moth of the family Tortricidae. It is found in Tungurahua Province, Ecuador. It is one of over 100 known members of the genus Argyrotaenia.

The wingspan is about 17 mm. The ground colour of the forewings is grey with weak brownish-grey short lines. The markings are brownish grey. The hindwings are grey brown, but whiter towards the base.

Etymology
The species name refers to the colouration of the hindwings and is derived from Latin posticus (hind) and cnephaeus (meaning dark).

References

Moths described in 2009
posticicnephaea
Moths of South America